Viktor Leonidovych Arefyev (born 23 January 1975) is a Ukrainian retired professional football forward.

Together with Vasyl Sachko (Volyn Lutsk), Arefyev became the highest scorer when he scored 17 goals for Stal Alchevsk during the 2001–02 Ukrainian First League season.

References

External links
 
 

1975 births
Living people
People from Horlivka
Ukrainian footballers
Ukrainian Premier League players
Ukrainian First League players
Ukrainian Second League players
Armenian Premier League players
FC Khartsyzk players
FC Stal Alchevsk players
FC Stal-2 Alchevsk players
FC Arsenal Kyiv players
FC CSKA Kyiv players
FC Naftovyk-Ukrnafta Okhtyrka players
FC Podillya Khmelnytskyi players
FC Urartu players
FC Olimpik Donetsk players
FC Makiyivvuhillya Makiyivka players
Association football forwards
Sportspeople from Donetsk Oblast
Ukrainian expatriate footballers
Expatriate footballers in Armenia
Ukrainian expatriate sportspeople in Armenia